The 1934–35 Yugoslav Football Championship (Serbo-Croato-Slovenian: Državno prvenstvo 1934/35 / Државно првенство 1934/35) was the 12th season of Kingdom of Yugoslavia's premier football competition.

League table

Results

Winning squad
Champions:

BSK Belgrade (coach: Josef Uridil)
Franjo Glazer
Predrag Radovanović
Milorad Mitrović
Vlastimir Petković
Milorad Arsenijević
Ivan Stevović
Radivoj Božić
Bruno Knežević
Aleksandar Tirnanić
Joška Nikolić
Slavko Šurdonja
Vojin Božović
Blagoje Marjanović
Djordje Vujadinović
Svetislav Glišović
Ljubiša Djordjević

Top scorers
Final goalscoring position, number of goals, player/players and club.
1 - 18 goals - Leo Lemešić (Hajduk Split)
2 - 14 goals - Đorđe Vujadinović (BSK Belgrade), Aleksandar Tomašević (BASK)

See also
Yugoslav Cup
Yugoslav League Championship
Football Association of Yugoslavia

References

External links
Yugoslavia Domestic Football Full Tables

Yugoslav Football Championship
Yugo
1934–35 in Yugoslav football